BTB/POZ domain-containing protein 1 is a protein that in humans is encoded by the BTBD1 gene.

Function 

The C-terminus of the protein encoded by this gene binds topoisomerase I. The N-terminus contains a proline-rich region and a BTB/POZ domain (broad-complex, Tramtrack and bric a brac/Pox virus and Zinc finger), both of which are typically involved in protein-protein interactions. Subcellularly, the protein localizes to cytoplasmic bodies. Alternative splicing results in multiple transcript variants encoding different isoforms.

Interactions 

BTBD1 has been shown to interact with TOP1.

References

External links

Further reading